Henry Folliott, 3rd Baron Folliott (died 17 October 1716) was an Irish nobleman and politician.

He succeeded to the title Baron Folliott and to extensive Irish estates on the death in 1697 of his father Thomas Folliott of Ferney Hall, Onibury, Ludlow, Shropshire and Wardtown Castle, Ballymacaward, Co Donegal. He sat as member of parliament (MP) for Ballyshannon in the Irish House of Commons from 1695 to 1697.

He married Elizabeth Pudsey, heiress of Langley Hall, Sutton Coldfield in 1677 and built a substantial mansion, Four Oaks Hall, Sutton Coldfield, to a design by architect William Wilson. His one daughter by Elizabeth, Rebecca, died in 1697.

He died without a son and the Barony became extinct on his death. His estates devolved upon a relative, Lieutenant General John Folliott, and upon his five sisters.

References 

1716 deaths
Politicians from County Donegal
18th-century Irish people
Barons in the Peerage of Ireland
Irish MPs 1695–1699
Members of the Parliament of Ireland (pre-1801) for County Donegal constituencies
Year of birth unknown